Arthur Davidson Sr. (February 11, 1881 – December 30, 1950) was an American businessman. He was one of the four original founders of Harley-Davidson.

Early life
Davidson was born in Milwaukee, Wisconsin, to William C Davidson  (1846–1923), who was born and grew up in Angus, Scotland, and Margaret Adams McFarlane (1843–1933) of Scottish descent from the small Scottish settlement of Cambridge, Wisconsin, and raised five children together: Janet May, William A., Walter, Arthur and Elizabeth. 
Arthur's grandfather Alexander "Sandy" Davidson (from Aberlemno, Scotland) and Margaret Scott immigrated from Scotland to the United States in 1858 with their six children, including Arthur's father William.

Eventually they settled in Wisconsin, and it was there that, in 1903, Arthur, went into business with William S. Harley, making motorcycles in his family shed. 
One of Davidson's favorite pastimes was fishing in the Wisconsin wilderness, which inspired him to create a motorcycle that would, "take the hard work out of pedaling a bicycle". He was a storyteller, salesman, and United States patriot. During World Wars I and II, Arthur and the company diverted motorcycle production to support US troops.

The "Honey Uncle" story is one of the family stories told about Davidson and a pivotal moment for the fate of the Harley-Davidson company. One day shortly after Davidson's cleaning lady visited, he discovered the seed money he had stashed between his mattress to start Harley-Davidson was missing. Davidson was able to borrow the $170 in venture capital needed for Harley-Davidson from an uncle who owned a bee farm in Madison, Wisconsin.  From then on, the uncle was known as the "Honey Uncle" for helping the business get off the ground. The bee farm on Lake Mendota was later sold to the University of Wisconsin–Madison, and is now known as Picnic Point in the Lakeshore Nature Preserve.

Davidson was credited with the slogan, "Take the Work out of Bicycling", which inspired him and his 21-year-old friend Harley as they worked tirelessly in a 10 x 15 foot shed.

Also killed in the accident were Davidson's wife, Clara, as well as Dorothy and Donald Jeffery.

Labor Hall of Fame
Because Arthur Davidson, William A. Davidson, Walter Davidson and William S. Harley, "both used and believed in its products and relied on the dedication of its employees to produce quality motorcycles", the four men were inducted into the Labor Hall of Fame.

References

External links

 The Davidson Legacy 

1881 births
1950 deaths
20th-century American businesspeople
American chief executives in the automobile industry
American founders of automobile manufacturers
American manufacturing businesspeople
American people of Scottish descent
American salespeople
Businesspeople from Wisconsin
Harley-Davidson designers
Harley-Davidson executives
Road incident deaths in Wisconsin